"High Low and In Between" is a song written by David Kent and Harley Campbell, and recorded by American country music singer Mark Wills. It was released in October 1996 as the second single from his self-titled debut album.

Content
Jeffrey B. Remz of Country Standard Time called the song "a fiddle-driven, mid-tempo song about a man under the spell of his woman."

The song was the B-side of Wills' debut single "Jacob's Ladder".

Critical reception
A review from Billboard was positive, praising Wills' "winning vocal personality" along with the presence of fiddle and steel guitar in the production.

Chart performance

References

1996 songs
1996 singles
Mercury Nashville singles
Mark Wills songs
Song recordings produced by Carson Chamberlain
Song recordings produced by Keith Stegall